Helen Sampson (18 March 1885 – 1976) was a British painter. Her work was part of the painting event in the art competition at the 1948 Summer Olympics.

References

1885 births
1976 deaths
20th-century British painters
British women painters
Olympic competitors in art competitions
Painters from London